Dombe Grande is a town, with a population of 25,000 (2014), and a commune in the province of Benguela, Angola.

References

Populated places in Benguela Province
Municipalities of Angola